The 2014–15 season was Swansea City's 95th season in the English football league system, and their fourth consecutive season in the Premier League. They also competed in the FA Cup and the Football League Cup.

Squad and coaching staff information

First team squad

 
Ordered by 2014–15 squad numbers.

Club staff

Coaching staff

Source: Swansea City A.F.C.

Board of directors

Source: Swansea City A.F.C.

Transfers & loans

Transfer in

† effective 1 July 2014

Transfer out

Loan in

‡ Officially signed on 1 January 2015.

Loan out

New contracts

Pre-season & friendlies
Swansea's pre-season preparations began by travelling to Chicago for a two-week training camp. Their first pre-season match came against Mexican side Guadalajara at Miller Park on 16 July. The game finished 1–1, with Nathan Dyer scoring Swansea's goal in the 57th minute. Neil Taylor and Guadalajara's Jesús Sánchez García were both sent off in the 80th minute. Three days later Swansea faced NASL side Minnesota United in Blaine, losing the game 2–0.

Following the conclusion of the US tour, Swansea's next game came against League Two side Plymouth Argyle. The Swans won the match 4–0, courtesy of goals from Rory Donnelly, Jordi Amat, and two goals from new signing Gylfi Sigurðsson. A couple of days later, Swansea registered their second win of their pre-season with a 2–0 win over Exeter City. The goals were scored by Bafétimbi Gomis and Josh Sheehan.

A mixture of youth and first team players faced Bournemouth on 1 August, which saw Swansea defeated 3–1. Swansea's new Ecuadorian winger Jefferson Montero scored their only goal in the 68th minute. The following day, Swansea travelled to the Madejski Stadium to face Championship side Reading. Swansea ran out 3–1 winners. Wayne Routledge scored two goals in two minutes in the first half, and Gomis scored Swansea's third in the 65th minute.

On 9 August, Swansea's final pre-season friendly saw them face La Liga side Villarreal at the Liberty Stadium. They lost the match 3–0, with goals coming from Ikechukwu Uche, Bruno Soriano and Denis Cheryshev.

Competition

Overall

Premier League

League table

Results summary

Results by matchday

Matches

August
The fixture list for the 2014–15 Premier League season was announced on 18 June 2014. Swansea began their league campaign with a 2–1 away win against Manchester United on 16 August 2014. Ki Sung-yueng put Swansea into the lead in the 28th minute with a shot from the edge of the penalty box. Wayne Rooney then scored with an overhead kick to equalise early in the second half, but Gylfi Sigurðsson scored the winning goal for Swansea in the 72nd minute. A week after the victory at Old Trafford, Swansea continued their winning start to the season by beating newly promoted side Burnley 1–0 at the Liberty Stadium. Nathan Dyer scored the only goal of the game in the 23rd minute with a low shot. Swansea finished August with a home game against West Bromwich Albion. Two goals from Dyer and volley from Wayne Routledge saw Swansea win the game 3–0. Three successive wins at the start of the season ensured that this was Swansea's best start to a season for 91 years. Garry Monk was named Premier League Manager of the Month for August.

September
Swansea suffered their first defeat of the season when they travelled to Stamford Bridge to face Chelsea. Swansea took the lead when John Terry scored an own goal by deflecting a Neil Taylor cross into his own net. Diego Costa levelled the match at 1–1 just before half-time. Costa then followed that up with two further goals in the second half to complete his hat-trick. Loïc Rémy scored Chelsea's fourth goal, before Jonjo Shelvey scored a consolation goal for the Swans in the 86th minute to finish the match 4–2. Swansea next faced Southampton on 20 September. Wilfried Bony was sent off in the 39th minute courtesy of two yellow cards, but Swansea managed to stay in the game until the 80th minute, before Victor Wanyama scored the only goal of the game to give Southampton a 1–0 win. Swansea's run of two consecutive defeats came to an end when they travelled to the Stadium of Light to take on Sunderland. Swansea managed to keep a clean sheet and earned a 0–0 draw, despite Àngel Rangel's dismissal in the 81st minute for two yellow cards. Swansea finished the month in fifth place.

October
On 4 October, Swansea took the lead twice against Newcastle United with goals from Routledge and Bony, however Papiss Cissé equalised on both occasions to finish the match 2–2.  On 19 October, Swansea travelled away to take on Stoke City. Swansea were awarded a penalty kick in the 34th minute thanks to Ryan Shawcross committing a foul on Bony. Bony scored the resulting penalty to make it 1–0. Charlie Adam then scored a penalty for Stoke, as Àngel Rangel was adjudged to have fouled Victor Moses inside the penalty area. Jonathan Walters then scored the winning goal for Stoke in the 76th minute.   After the game Garry Monk claimed that Victor Moses had dived for the penalty, and that he was “disgusted” with referee Michael Oliver for awarding it. Monk was subsequently warned by the FA over his conduct in media interviews, but was not charged over the statements. Swansea's final game of October came against Leicester City at the Liberty Stadium. Bony scored two goals either side of half time to win the game 2–0.

November

December

January

February

March

April

May
 

 
Source: Swansea City A.F.C.

FA Cup

Source: Swansea City A.F.C.

League Cup

Swansea will enter the League Cup in the second round as one of the thirteen Premier League clubs not involved in European competition. They were drawn against Rotherham United at home. Gomis scored his first competitive goal for the Swans in the 22nd minute, in a 1–0 win. In the third round, Swansea were drawn to face fellow Premier League side Everton. Swansea recorded their first ever win over Everton to reach the fourth round of the Capital One Cup.

Source: Swansea City A.F.C.

Statistics

Appearances, goals and cards
Last updated on 24 May 2015

Source:

Overall summary

Summary

Score overview

References

2014-15
2014–15 Premier League by team
Welsh football clubs 2014–15 season